Mount Josephine is a subglacial mound in the Tuya Range in British Columbia, Canada. It is located near the northwestern shore of Tuya Lake.

See also
 Northern Cordilleran Volcanic Province
 List of Northern Cordilleran volcanoes
 Volcanology of Western Canada

References

External links
 Canadian Mountain Encyclopedia

Volcanoes of British Columbia
One-thousanders of British Columbia
Northern Cordilleran Volcanic Province
Subglacial mounds of Canada
Pleistocene volcanoes
Monogenetic volcanoes
Quaternary British Columbia
Cassiar Land District